Acacia concurrens, commonly known as curracabah or black wattle, is a shrub native to Queensland in eastern Australia.

Formerly known as Acacia cunninghamii, the new name Acacia concurrens describes the converging primary veins on the phyllodes. It is very similar to Acacias such as Acacia leiocalyx and Acacia disparrima.

Description
The shrub can grow as high as  but is typically smaller. The glossy green phyllodes have an obliquely obovate shape with the lower margin that is almost straight. It blooms between March and September producing rod shaped flowers are bright yellow that are found in pairs in the leaf axils.

Taxonomy
The species was first formally described by the botanist Leslie Pedley in 1974 as part of the work Contributions from the Queensland Herbarium . It was reclassified as Racosperma concurrens in 1986 by Pedley then transferred back to genusAcacia in 2001.

Distribution
It is endemic to an area from south eastern Queensland in the north to northern New South Wales in the south where it is common in coastal areas from around the Mooloolah River in Queensland down to the Hastings River in New South Wales on hillsides or plateaux growing in sandy or stony sandy loams often over shale as part of the understorey in Eucalyptus forest communities.

See also
 List of Acacia species

References

Flora of Queensland
Flora of New South Wales
concurrens
Taxa named by Leslie Pedley
Plants described in 1974